A list of notable linguists and philologists from Slovenia:

A 
 Matija Ahacel

B 
 Adam Bohorič
 Anton Bezenšek

Č 
 Matija Čop

D 
 Peter Dajnko

G 
 Janez Gradišnik

J 
 Anton Janežič
 Primož Jakopin
 Jurij Japelj
 Urban Jarnik

K 
 Jernej Kopitar
 Sebastijan Krelj

L 
 Rado Lenček
 Fran Levstik
 Tine Logar

M 
 Franz Miklosich
 Fran Metelko
 Matija Murko

O 
 Janez Orešnik

P 
 Marko Pohlin

R 
 Fran Ramovš

S 
 Marko Snoj
 Luka Svetec

T 
 Jože Toporišič

 
 
Linguist